Igor Kunitsyn, who was last year's winner, reached the final, however he lost to Ivan Dodig 4–6, 3–6.

Seeds

Draw

Finals

Top half

Bottom half

References
 Main Draw
 Qualifying Draw

President's Cup - Singles
2010 Singles